Ocoba is a monotypic snout moth genus. Its one species, Ocoba melanophila, was described by Harrison Gray Dyar Jr. in 1914. It is found in Panama.

References

Moths described in 1914
Chrysauginae
Monotypic moth genera
Moths of Central America
Pyralidae genera